Henry Anderson (born 1800) was a Philadelphia-area street vendor known as The Hominy Man, who became a local legend, beginning in about 1828, for his cries, which he used to hawk his wares. His were said to be the "most musical of all cries", and he was noted for his "strong resonant 'tenor robusto'".

Two examples of his cries:

Notes

References

1800 births
Year of death missing
Businesspeople from Philadelphia
19th century in Philadelphia
Street vendors